Desmosomatidae is a family of isopods belonging to the order Isopoda.

Genera

Genera:
 Balbidocolon Hessler, 1970
 Chelantermedia Brix, 2006
 Chelator Hessler, 1970

References

Isopoda